Aghajanyan, also transliterated as Aghajanian, (Աղաճանեան) is an Armenian surname. Notable people with the surname include:

George Aghajanian (born 1932), American neuroscientist
Markar Aghajanyan (born 1965), Iranian Armenian footballer and manager
Stepan Aghajanian (1863–1940), Armenian painter

See also
Agajanian

Armenian-language surnames